Ferocactus histrix, also known as Acitrón barrel cactus (Biznaga barril de acitrón) is a species of Ferocactus native to central Mexico.
It is a large barrel cactus that can be commonly found throughout all the Central Mexican matorral. It produces an edible fruit appreciated for its sour taste.

Description
This cactus grows as an unbranched spherical globe, and can reach more than 1 meter (3.3 ft) in height after several years. Mature plants can have their stem divided in up to 25 to 40 ribs.

Spines are light yellow, and in older specimens can measure more than 4cm in length.
The epidermis is blue-green in mature plants.

It produces yellow medium-sized flowers from early to late spring and usually the fruits are mature by summer. It flowers when the plant is 10 years or older, though in cultivation they can flower earlier.

As in other cacti species, when the apical meristem is damaged, the plant produces new shoots from the areoles close to the tip of the stem.

Distribution and habitat
This cactus can be found (from east to west) in Hidalgo, Querétaro, Guanajuato, San Luis Potosí, Aguascalientes, Jalisco, Zacatecas and Durango which makes it one of the barrel cacti with some of the largest distribution. It grows in xeric shrublands and volcanic slopes.

References

External links
 
 

histrix
Flora of Mexico
Plants described in 1955